Sir Thomas Fanshawe KB (1580 – 17 December 1631) was an English government official and politician who sat in the House of Commons between 1601 and 1629.

Fanshawe was the second son of Thomas Fanshawe and first son by his second wife Joan Smythe, daughter of Customer Smythe and was baptised on 15 September 1580. His father was Queen's Remembrancer of the Exchequer. He was educated at Queens' College, Cambridge and admitted at the Inner Temple in 1595. He was an auditor for the Duchy of Lancaster. In 1601, he inherited the estate of  Jenkins and Barking Manor, Essex, on the death of his father.

Also in 1601 Fanshawe was elected Member of Parliament for Bedford. He was elected MP for Lancaster in 1604. In 1606 became a barrister. He was re-elected MP for Lancaster in 1614 and 1621. He was knighted by King James in 1624. He was reelected MP for Lancaster in 1624, 1625, 1626 and 1628 and sat until 1629 when King Charles decided to rule without parliament for eleven years.

Fanshawe married Anne Babington, daughter of Urias Babington and had three sons, of which only one, Thomas, survived him. He was half-brother of Sir Henry Fanshawe.

References

1580 births
1631 deaths
English MPs 1601
English MPs 1604–1611
English MPs 1614
English MPs 1621–1622
English MPs 1624–1625
English MPs 1625
English MPs 1626
English MPs 1628–1629
Alumni of Queens' College, Cambridge
Members of the Inner Temple
Fanshawe family